Herman Slater (1938 – July 9, 1992) was an American Wiccan high priest and occult-bookstore proprietor as well as an editor, publisher, and author. He died of AIDS in 1992.

Early life
Slater was born in 1938 in a lower-middle-class Jewish neighborhood of New York City. At a very early age, he became aware of anti-Semitism . This became one of the influences that led him to witchcraft. Slater studied business administration at New York University, liberal arts at Hunter College and traffic management at the Traffic Management Institute in New York. He also completed a full course at the United States Navy Personnel School at United States Naval Training Center Bainbridge. During 1958 through 1969, Slater had several business jobs in management, traffic expediting, and insurance claims investigation. 1969 marked the beginning of significant health-related issues for him. He was later forced to quit work due to bone tuberculosis, which cost him a hip bone and three years of recuperation.

Transition to witchcraft 
During his recuperation process, Slater began experiencing and reading about paranormal phenomena, including divination (tarot cards), clairvoyance, and levitation. He spent an entire year lying in bed in a body cast that weighed 300 pounds. Then one morning, he awoke to find himself stretched across a chair on the opposite side of the room while still in his body cast. These experiences led him to witchcraft, and in 1972 He met Eddie Buczynski (Lord Gwyddion), and they partnered in the Warlocke Shoppe, on Henry Street in Brooklyn Heights. It was there that two witches from England gave them the Welsh Tradition Book of Shadows and Herman and Eddie self 
initiated. Slater took the name Lord Govannon, and Eddie Lord Gwyddion. Eddie later made trips to Egypt and became part of an all male Minoan magic group in New York. Some of the original members of the coven Herman and Eddie formed left to form their own group. among these were authors Denny Sargent, who with Robert Carey, were co editors of a magazine for aspiring teen magicians called Mandragore. They and other members of the original coven moved on to ceremonial magic, and subscribed to an Ordo Templi Orientis (O.T.O.) correspondence course that was based out of London in the mid seventies. In 1977, the O.T.O. came to Slater's Magickal Childe, his new location in Manhattan's Chelsea.

Career 
Bucznski and Slater opened The Warlock Shoppe, the oldest witchcraft bookshop in Brooklyn, New York. Buczynski was the more magical and spiritual of the two and left the business side to Slater, who helped the shop grow in profit. Most importantly, the shop established itself as the central information hub for local witches and the newly emerging neopagan communities. The two also published a periodical called Earth Religion News. It was extremely successful but also caused controversy due to its explicit contents and cover designs. In 1974, Slater was initiated into the Gardnerian tradition and assumed leadership of the coven in the late 1970s. The Warlock Shoppe later moved to West 19th Street in Manhattan (the borough of New York City) and operated under the name Magickal Childe. The Magickal Childe functioned as a major focal point for the neopagan community in the 1970s and well into the 1990s. In the later 1980s it gained something of a mercenary reputation being willing to put 'curses' on people for a price. With Slater's death they started having trouble making ends meet and several significant new age publishers stopped providing them with books. The brick and mortar store finally closed in 1999.

Scandals 
In 1972, Slater presented the Inquisitional Bigot of the Year award to NBC during a guest appearance on the Today show, for an episode of Macmillan and Wife that had taken witchcraft and corrupted it into devil-worship rituals for the plot. The crew of Today had Slater physically removed from the set. More controversy surrounding Slater's actual proficiency in the types of magick he claimed to practice, accusations that he plagiarized material, yelling out at irritable customers in his Magickal Childe store, "Get out of my store...", as well as outrage over other behaviors he exhibited earned him the nickname "Horrible Herman".

Works 
Slater wrote the books:
 Introduction to Witchcraft,
 The Hoodoo Bible,
 A Book of Pagan Rituals I & II,
 Pagan Rituals III, 

Published:
 Earth Religion News magazine

Edited:
 The Magickal Formulary Spellbook,
 The Magickal Formulary Spellbook II, 

These two witchcraft cookbooks are based on the inner workings of his shop and formulas of his potions. They are sold worldwide and are well-respected within the witchcraft community. The Magickal Childe now continues with an Internet presence.

Educating others 
Educating people on the subject of witchcraft became an important mission for Slater. He frequently lectured as a guest speaker at many colleges. He starred in his own video, An Introduction to Witchcraft and Satanism, in which he wore ceremonial robes and headdresses typical of witchcraft. He also appeared with his familiar companion, a snake named Herman. He also hosted a weekly cable show which aired in Manhattan, called The Magickal Mystery Tour. The show featured interviews, rituals, music, occultism, and magick instruction. He thought of the show as an Earth religion 700 Club because it spread the word on the Old Religion and asked for donations.

Philosophy 

Herman Slater considered Wicca to be an earth religion. In the early days of the Warlocke Shop he hosted The Pagan Way lectures, usually in a coven members apartment and sometimes his own on Atlantic Avenue. The Pagan Way ran the gammit, embracing the various pre-Christian religions and paranormal. Some of the Pagan Way lecturers promoted their works, including Dr. Leo Martello. Herman was tolerant of quite a lot, but would rein in adult activities if he expected youth to be present. His come all approach overwhelmed him in his Manhattan location, and with Eddie seldom around, Herman was preyed upon. He never requested money for the lectures or use of his ritual room, and sometimes complained that the Wiccans were there a lot but spent very little money, though the satanists had cash. Even so, he provided a platform for alternative religions as long as he could. Herman was about inclusion, self empowerment, and love.

Praise 
One of Slater's former employees described him as "Very bright, almost schizophrenic, fiercely loyal one moment, then your brutal enemy the next. I loved and hated him so many times in turn that it's all a blur." However, many loyal followers were befriended by Slater, including most of his loyal employees, loving family and friends. He was affectionately known as Mother Herman to those he cared about. Herman's attraction to witchcraft was not limited to paranormal experiences. He was truly on a spiritual quest for a religion that would not condemn his sexuality, and believed homosexuality was the expression of a man finding completion of his soul through the love of another man. Wicca had no taboos regarding homosexuality or self empowerment, another of Herman's quests that he shared with the world. Among his famous quotes was:"everythings in print now." Meaning magic was no longer held in the hands of the elite alone.

See also 
 Witchcraft

Sources 
 Footnotes

 Bibliography

External links 
 
 Collection of citations

1935 births
1992 deaths
Businesspeople from New York City
Gardnerian Wiccans
Writers from New York City
American book editors
Wicca in the United States
20th-century American non-fiction writers
American people of Jewish descent
Converts from Judaism
LGBT Wiccans
LGBT people from New York (state)
American gay writers
AIDS-related deaths in New York (state)
20th-century American male writers
American male non-fiction writers
Wiccans of Jewish descent
20th-century American businesspeople
20th-century American LGBT people